Christopher "Chris" Tague is an American politician, farmer, and businessman from the state of New York. A Republican, Tague has represented the 102nd district of the New York State Assembly, covering parts of the Hudson Valley, since 2018.

Career
After graduating from high school in 1987, Tague ran a dairy business, selling it in 1992. From 1992 until 2017, Tague worked at Cobleskill Stone Products, eventually becoming the company's general manager. 

He also served as Schoharie Town Supervisor between 2016 and 2018.

Electoral history
In April 2018, upon the resignation of Republican Assemblyman Pete Lopez to become a regional administrator for the Environmental Protection Agency, a special election was held in the Assembly's 102nd district. After a closely fought campaign, Tague defeated Democrat Aidan O'Connor 46-44%, with Reform Party candidate Wesley Laraway taking the remainder.

Both Tague and O'Connor ran for a full term that following November. In a much higher turnout election, Tague defeated O'Connor by a wide margin, 56-44%.

After State Senator James Seward announced he wouldn't seek re-election to the 51st district in 2020, Tague was mentioned as a potential candidate, but he declined.

Personal life 
Tague was born and raised in Schoharie, New York, along with 2 siblings. He continues to live in Schoharie.

References

Living people
People from Schoharie, New York
Republican Party members of the New York State Assembly
21st-century American politicians
Year of birth missing (living people)